Robinson Community Unit School District 2 (Robinson CUSD #2) is a school district headquartered in Robinson, Illinois, United States.

 the superintendent is Josh Quick.

The first high school was established in 1885, and a one room schoolhouse already existed at that time.

Schools 
 Robinson High School
 Nuttall Middle School
 Lincoln Grade School (grades 3–5)
 Washington Elementary School (grades PreK-2)

References

External links 
 

School districts in Illinois
Education in Crawford County, Illinois